AGFA Impax 6 is a PACS client for Windows-based PCs, written by AGFA. It is proprietary software for use at medical facilities using a digital radiology imaging system. It is the sixth release of the IMPAX client.

Features
IMPAX 6 features both local and remote access. The client can connect to the PACS server from home or office locations. This is accomplished via thin and fat client technology. The latest version is Impax 6.6, which features a stethoscope login screen.

External links
 Radiologist's Blog mentioning Impax 6

Medical software
Agfa